The (Lo) Monge de Montaudon (meaning "monk of Montaudon") (fl. 1193–1210), born Pèire de Vic, was a nobleman, monk, and troubadour from the Auvergne, born at the castle of Vic-sur-Cère near Aurillac, where he became a Benedictine monk around 1180. According to his vida, he composed "couplets while he was in the monastery and sirventes on subjects that were popular in the region."

Life
The Monge requested and received the priory of Montaudon from the abbot of Aurillac. Montaudon may be identified with Montauban or perhaps with a Mons Odonis southeast of Clermont. He became so popular with local nobility that he was taken from his monastery to serve them, receiving honours and gifts in return. In this way he greatly improved the state of his priorate and, upon his request, was released from his monastic vocation by his abbot to follow Alfonso II of Aragon, whose vassal the viscount of Carlat and lord of Vic was. This is the view of his vida; he may have simply abandoned holy orders. Internal evidence in his poems suggests wide wanderings, to Périgord, Languedoc, and Catalonia, and the patronage of Dalfi d'Alvernha and Maria de Ventadorn.

At Alfonso's court, according to his vida, he ate meat, courted women, and composed songs and poems. In return he was appointed lord of the poetical society of Puy Sainta Maria (Puy-Sainte-Marie) at Le-Puy-en-Velay (Podium Aniciense) and received a sparrow hawk, the prize the society granted for superb poetry. According to his vida, he held the "suzerainty" of the "court of Puy" (cour du Puy) until it was dissolved.

After this he went to Roussillon, where he became prior of the Benedictine priory of Saint-Pierre-de-Belloc, near Villafranca, though this establishment was not, contrary to his vida, a dependent of Aurillac. He is said to have "enriched [the priory] and improved it" before "ending his days" there.

Songs
The Monge's earliest song which can be reliably dated refers to the captivity of Richard I of England in Austria (1192–1194). He wrote four :  and  being two. His  are "rich in feudal metaphors".

Among the Monge's other works,  and  have been translated into English as "What I Like" and "What I Don't Like" respectively. He wrote fictional  with God. Around 1192–4 he wrote , a famous parody of a satire of Peire d'Alvernha. In it he insults his contemporaries, such as Arnaut Daniel, Arnaut de Maruelh, Folquet de Marselha, Gaucelm Faidit, Guilhem Ademar, Guillem de Saint Didier, Peire Vidal, Peirol, Raimon Jordan, and Raimon de Miraval. Two of his melodies survive. Only one melody by the Monge himself—for a  entitled —survives. Nonetheless, this lone piece of work is characterised by phrase variation and motivic transformation, with an unexpected ending.

The poem  was appended to a set of four by the Monge in the 13th century, but it is probably a work of Jausbert de Puycibot.

Sources

Aubrey, Elizabeth. The Music of the Troubadours. Indiana University Press, 1996. .
Chambers, Frank M. "On the Attribution of a Provençal Poem." Modern Language Notes, Vol. 62, No. 5. (May, 1947), pp. 320–322.
Egan, Margarita (trans.) The Vidas of the Troubadours. New York: Garland, 1984. .
Gaunt, Simon, and Kay, Sarah (edd.) The Troubadours: An Introduction. Cambridge: Cambridge University Press, 1999. .
Kehew, Robert (ed.) Lark in the Morning: The Verses of the Troubadours. Ezra Pound and William De Witt Snodgrass, trans. Chicago: University of Chicago Press, 2005. .
Routledge, Michael J. Les Poésies du Moine de Montaudon. Montpellier: 1977.

External links
 Complete works in Old Occitan on trobar.org

Notes

13th-century French troubadours
French Benedictines
Year of death unknown
Year of birth unknown
12th-century French troubadours
People from Cantal